
Xi is the romanization in Pinyin of several different Chinese family names, including:

 (see Chinese Wikipedia article)
 (see Chinese Wikipedia article)
 (see Chinese Wikipedia article)
 (see Chinese Wikipedia article) This is the most common surname romanized "Xi", making up approximately 0.01% of the population of Mainland China.

 (see Chinese Wikipedia article)
 (see Chinese Wikipedia article)

Xi is spelled "Hsi" in Wade-Giles.

People

奚
It is the 45th name in the Hundred Family Surnames poem written during the Song dynasty, around 1000 years ago.
Ming Xi (born 1990), Chinese fashion model
Xi Aihua (born 1982), Chinese rower
Xi Xiaoming (born 1954), Chinese judge

席
It is the 133rd name in the Hundred Family Surnames poem. During the Chu–Han Contention, many people surnamed Ji changed their surname to Xi because of naming taboo of Xiang Yu, the Hegemon-King of Western Chu, whose given name was Ji.

Xi Murong (born 1943), Chinese writer 
Xi Shengmo (1836–1896), Chinese religious leader
Xi Zezong (1927–2008), Chinese astronomer

習/习

It is 332nd in the Hundred Family Surnames poem. However it is not among the 400 most common surnames, occupying 0.01% of the Han population. 
Xi Zuochi (316–384), Chinese historian
Xi Zhongxun (1913–2002), Chinese politician, father of Xi Jinping
Xi Jinping (born 1953), Chinese politician, CCP general secretary and 6th paramount leader of China
Xi Mingze (born 1992), only child and daughter of Xi Jinping

郗
It is 234th in the Hundred Family Surnames poem.
Xiaoxing Xi (born 1958), American physicist

Pen name
Xi Xi, pseudonym of Zhang Yan (born 1938), Chinese author and poet

See also
Xi (disambiguation)
Ximen, a surname

References

Chinese-language surnames
Multiple Chinese surnames